The Armenian Evangelical Church of New York, the oldest Armenian institution in the New York metropolitan area, was founded in 1896. It is located at 152 East 34th Street, in Manhattan, New York City.

Rev. H.H. Khazoyan was the first pastor of the church. Services were initially conducted at the Adams Memorial Presbyterian Church, but in 1923, a building originally planned as a bank on 34th Street, its current location, was acquired.

Rev. Antranig Bedikian served the church for nearly 40 years (1915-1953).  The current pastor is Rev. Dr. Haig Kherlopian.

It is a member church of the Armenian Evangelical Union of North America.

Pastors
Rev. H. H. Khazoyan (1896-1901)
Rev. H. B. Garabedian (1901-1908)
Rev. M. G. Papazian (1908-1914)
Rev. Antranig Bedikian (1915-1953)
Rev. Nishan Bekian (1936-1942)
Rev. Zakariah Boudakian (1947-1950)
Rev. Dr. Dicran Kassouni (1955-1959)
Rev. Vartkes Kassouni (1959-1964)
Rev. Senekerim Sulahian (1964-1975)
Rev. Zenas Ilanjian (1976-1979)
Rev. G. Diran Minassian (1979-1981)
Rev. Dr. Herald Hassessian (1981-1985)
Rev. Daniel Albarian (1985-1988)
Rev. Dr. Leon Tavitian (1988-1995)
Rev. Dr. Herald Hassessian (1995-1996)
Rev. L. Nishan Bakalian (1995-2000)
Rev. Dr. Peter Doghramji (2000-2004; 2006-2011)
Rev. Dr. Haig Kherlopian (2013-...)

References

External links

Churches in Manhattan
Armenian-American culture in New York City
Armenian Evangelical churches
Kips Bay, Manhattan